Belfort is an unincorporated community in Mono County, California.

The place was a mining camp in the 1880s.

References

Unincorporated communities in California
Unincorporated communities in Mono County, California